Vineet Bhatia London (formerly Rasoi) was a Michelin-starred Indian restaurant operated by Vineet Bhatia in London, England.

As Rasoi, the restaurant held one star in the Michelin Guide for 12 years. Vineet Bhatia London received a Michelin star on September 21, 2017, and closed one week later, with no explanation beyond a Twitter announcement that "VBL needs to move out for a fresh start".

See also
 List of Indian restaurants

References 

Defunct Indian restaurants
Defunct restaurants in London
Indian restaurants in London
Michelin Guide starred restaurants in the United Kingdom